Stalin Ortiz (born February 8, 1981), is a Colombian professional basketball player.  He currently plays for the Condores club of the Baloncesto Profesional Colombiano league.

He represented Colombia's national basketball team at the 2016 South American Basketball Championship, where he had most minutes, points and steals for his team.

References

External links
 ESPN profile
 Yahoo profile
 Latinbasket.com Profile

1981 births
Living people
Central American and Caribbean Games silver medalists for Colombia
Colombian expatriate basketball people in Argentina
Colombian expatriate basketball people in Italy
Colombian expatriate basketball people in Venezuela
Colombian men's basketball players
Competitors at the 2018 Central American and Caribbean Games
Estudiantes de Bahía Blanca basketball players
Regatas Corrientes basketball players
Shooting guards
Sportspeople from Cali
S.S. Felice Scandone players
Trotamundos B.B.C. players
Valparaiso Beacons men's basketball players
Central American and Caribbean Games medalists in basketball
21st-century Colombian people
Colombian expatriate basketball people in the United States